Myrrhinitis sporeuta is a moth in the family Elachistidae, and the only species in the genus Myrrhinitis. It was described by Edward Meyrick in 1913. It is found in South Africa.

References

Endemic moths of South Africa
Moths described in 1913
Elachistidae
Moths of Africa